Doe (Dohe) is a Bantu language of the Pwani region of Tanzania.

References

External links 
 ELAR archive of Documenting the Dowe language

Languages of Tanzania
Northeast Coast Bantu languages